Billy Drennan (born 2003) is an Irish hurler. At club level he plays with Galmoy and at inter-county level with the Kilkenny senior hurling team.

Career

Drennan first played hurling at juvenile and underage levels with the Galmoy club, while also playing as a schoolboy with CBS Kilkenny in the Leinster Colleges' Championship. He has also lined out with Maynooth University in the Fitzgibbon Cup.

Drennan first appeared on the inter-county scene as a member of the Kilkenny minor hurling team that lost the 2019 All-Ireland minor final to Galway. He was the championship's top scorer with 2-66. Brennan was again part of the minor team that lost the 2020 All-Ireland minor final to Galway. He immediately progressed to the under-20 team and was man of the match when Kilkenny beat Limerick in the 2022 All-Ireland under-20 final.

Drennan first played for the senior team during the 2023 Walsh Cup.

Career statistics

Honours

Kilkenny
All-Ireland Under-20 Hurling Championship: 2022
Leinster Under-20 Hurling Championship: 2022
Leinster Minor Hurling Championship: 2020

References

2003 births
Living people
Galmoy hurlers
Kilkenny inter-county hurlers